Martine Taelman (born 1965) is a Belgian politician and a member of the Open VLD. She was elected as a member of the Belgian Senate in 2007.

References

External links

Living people
Open Vlaamse Liberalen en Democraten politicians
Members of the Belgian Federal Parliament
1965 births
21st-century Belgian politicians
21st-century Belgian women politicians